The McCoy Solar Energy Project is a 250 megawatt (MWAC) photovoltaic power plant near the city of Blythe in  Riverside County, California.

It occupies about 2,300 acres of mostly public land in the Mojave Desert.  The construction uses CdTe thin film panels from First Solar,  and the output is being sold to Southern California Edison under a power purchase agreement.

The project is located adjacent to the 235 MW Blythe Solar Energy Center, together forming a larger 485 MW complex.  The 550MW Desert Sunlight Solar Farm is located approximately 40miles west in Riverside County. The 450 MW Desert Quartzite project by First Solar, which got preliminary approval in early 2020, is also in the area.

History 

The project was initially proposed in early 2013 for a final capacity of 750MW,  making it potentially one of the world's largest solar plants.  The planning process through both state and federal agencies was placed on an expedited approval path.  The first construction phase of 250MW started generating energy in August 2015, and reached its full capacity in June 2016.  Completion of the remaining 500MW is pending identification of a buyer for the electricity.

Electricity Production

See also

Desert Sunlight Solar Farm
Blythe Mesa Solar Power Project
Solar power plants in the Mojave Desert

References 

Solar power in the Mojave Desert
Photovoltaic power stations in the United States
Buildings and structures in Riverside County, California
Solar power stations in California
Energy infrastructure completed in 2016
2016 establishments in California
NextEra Energy